The Dodge Demon is a concept car made by DaimlerChrysler, designed to slot in under the Viper as a more affordable sports car from Dodge. The Demon was first shown at the 2007 Geneva Auto Show, and it was considered for production. It was conceived to compete with cars like the Pontiac Solstice, Saturn Sky, and Mazda MX-5 Miata. Unlike many other concept cars, the materials and construction design of the Demon were such that production would be feasible.

Technical specifications
Engine: 2.4 L gasoline World Engine
Power:  SAE at6000rpm
Torque:  at 4400 rpm
Transmission: Six-speed manual
Drivetrain: Rear-wheel drive
Overall Length: 156.5 (3974)
Overall Width (max. @ body): 68.3 (1736)
Overall Height: 51.8 (1315)
Wheelbase: 95.6 (2429)
Overhang, Front: 30.6 (777)
Overhang, Rear: 30.3 (769)
Curb Weight (estimated): 2600 lb (1179 kg)
Tire Size, Front/Rear: 58.7 (1491)
Wheel Size: 19 x 8 in
Outer Diameter: 25.2 (640)

References

IGN's article on the Dodge Demon
Dodge Demon Information

Demon